Sweethearts is a 1938 American Technicolor musical romance film directed by W.S. Van Dyke and starring Jeanette MacDonald and Nelson Eddy. The screenplay, by Dorothy Parker and Alan Campbell, uses the “play within a play” device: a Broadway production of  the 1913 Victor Herbert operetta is the setting for another pair of sweethearts, the stars of the show. It was the first color film for Nelson or Jeanette (as well as MGM's first three strip Technicolor feature).  It was their first film together without uniforms or period costumes.

Plot

Broadway stars Gwen Marlowe (Jeanette MacDonald) and Ernest Lane (Nelson Eddy) are appearing in a 6-year run of  Victor Herbert's operetta Sweethearts (Ray Bolger dances the role of  Hans). They are also very much in love after six years of marriage. Norman Trumpett (Reginald Gardiner) is a successful Hollywood talent scout under pressure to recruit Marlowe and Lane for his studio, which their Broadway producer Felix Lehman (Frank Morgan) is equally determined to prevent.

The couple's attempts to rest and be together are repeatedly thwarted by professional and personal demands made on their time, talents and money by Lehman and their own theatrical families - who also live with them. Frustrated beyond endurance and seduced by Trumpett's idyllic (and false) description of working conditions in Hollywood, they decide to quit the show and take the Hollywood offer. (In guise of buying a new wardrobe for the trip Jeanette MacDonald models fashions of 1938.)

This spells “the end” for the Broadway production, news so devastating that constantly feuding playwright Leo Kronk (Mischa Auer) and composer Oscar Engel (Herman Bing) stop fighting long enough for Lehman, Kronk and company to hatch a counter-plot. By convincing Marlowe that Lane is having an affair with his pretty secretary Kay Jordan (Florence Rice) they split-up the happy couple, putting an end to the Hollywood deal and allowing Lehman to mount two separate touring companies of the show, each with one star and one understudy.

Delighted with the outcome, Engel produces Kronk's new play - which closes in a week. From a Variety review of the play, Marlowe and Lane realize they were tricked and join forces to confront Lehman, but nonetheless resume the Broadway run of Sweethearts together.

Cast
 Jeanette MacDonald as Gwen Marlowe
 Nelson Eddy as Ernest Lane
 Frank Morgan as Felix Lehman
 Ray Bolger as Hans
 Florence Rice as Kay Jordan
 Mischa Auer as Leo Kronk
 Herman Bing as Oscar Engel
 George Barbier as Benjamin Silver
 Reginald Gardiner as Norman Trumpett
 Fay Holden as Hannah
 Allyn Joslyn as Dink
 Lucile Watson as Mrs. Marlowe
 Gene Lockhart as Augustus
 Kathleen Lockhart as Aunt Amelia
 Berton Churchill as Sheridan
 Terry Kilburn as Brother
 Raymond Walburn as Orlando
 Douglas McPhail as Harvey
 Betty Jaynes as Una
 Olin Howland as Appleby
 Dalies Frantz as Concert Pianist

Awards
The film was nominated for two Academy Awards: Best Sound Recording (Douglas Shearer) and Best Music, Scoring (Herbert Stothart). The film was MGM's first feature-length color film, and it received an Honorary Academy Award for  its colour cinematography.

References

External links
 
 
 
 

1938 films
1930s color films
1930s romantic musical films
Metro-Goldwyn-Mayer films
Films directed by W. S. Van Dyke
Films with screenplays by Dorothy Parker
American romantic musical films
Photoplay Awards film of the year winners
1930s English-language films
1930s American films